Indian River High School is a high school in Massillon, Ohio.  It is a part of the Indian River Juvenile Correctional Facility.  All youth prisoners who do not have a high school degree are required to participate in the educational program. It takes in young men from the age of 12 to the age of 21.  They were awarded an accreditation from the American Correctional Association in 1998.

References

External links
 Correctional Facility Website

High schools in Stark County, Ohio
Public high schools in Ohio
Buildings and structures in Massillon, Ohio